The Amapá River is a river of the state of Amazonas, Brazil.
It is a tributary of the Matupiri River.

Course

The Amapá River rises in the  Lago do Capanã Grande Extractive Reserve, created in 2004.
It flows across the reserve in an east of northeast direction, crosses the Rio Amapá Sustainable Development Reserve and then flows through the Matupiri State Park, where it joins the Matupiri River.

See also
List of rivers of Amazonas

References

Rivers of Amazonas (Brazilian state)